The John Denham Palmer House (now also known as the Oxley-Heard Funeral Home) is a historic house in Fernandina Beach, Florida. It is located at 1305 Atlantic Avenue. On July 3, 1986, it was added to the U.S. National Register of Historic Places.

References

 Nassau County listings at National Register of Historic Places
 Nassau County listings at Florida's Office of Cultural and Historical Programs
 Oxley-Heard Funeral Directors

External links
 

Houses on the National Register of Historic Places in Florida
Houses in Nassau County, Florida
Vernacular architecture in Florida
National Register of Historic Places in Nassau County, Florida
Fernandina Beach, Florida